Eastern Market may refer to:

in Australia
 Eastern Market, Melbourne

in the United States
 Eastern Market, Detroit, Michigan
 Eastern Market, Washington, D.C., a marketplace listed on the NRHP
 Eastern Market (Washington Metro), a transit station